Mitostigma is a genus of plants in the Apocynaceae first described as a genus in 1844. It contains only one accepted species, Mitostigma castillonii, native to Jujuy Province in northwestern Argentina

formerly included
transferred to other genera (Ponerorchis, Philibertia )

References

Flora of Argentina
Asclepiadoideae
Monotypic Apocynaceae genera